The Australian Merino is an Australian breed or group of breeds of sheep, forming a significant part of the Merino group of breeds. Its origins lie in Merino sheep imported to Australia from South Africa in about 1796. By about 1830 there were almost two million Merinos in the country.

History 

In 1790 Charles IV of Spain sent a gift of Merino sheep from the Escurial cavana to the government of the Dutch Republic; they did not thrive there, but did well in the Dutch Cape Colony, in what is now South Africa.

The origins of the Australian Merino lie in some of these sheep imported to Australia by John Macarthur in 1796. By about 1830 there were almost two million Merinos in the country.

The original strain bred by Macarthur survives as the Camden Park or Macarthur Merino. The four principal breeds or strains that developed within the Australian Merino group were the Peppin, the Saxon, the South Australian and the Spanish. The Poll Merino or Australian Poll Merino is a recently-created polled variant. Other strains recognised as breeds include the Booroola Merino, the Bungaree Merino, the Dohne Merino, the Fonthill Merino, the Tasmanian Merino (which derives from the Saxon); and the Trangie Fertility.

References 

Sheep breeds originating in Australia
Sheep breeds